Franklinsundet is a strait between Storsteinhalvøya and Lågøya at the northern side of Nordaustlandet, Svalbard. The eastern side of the strait leads into Lady Franklinfjorden, named after Jane Franklin.

References

Straits of Svalbard